Benjamin Deicrowe, or Deicrow, Decrowe, or Decrow (c.1560s - c.1646) was an English merchant and warden of the Muscovy Company in 1617 and 1627. He was a freeman of the Merchant Adventurers, the Russia and the East India Companies. He gave his name to Deicrowe's Sound, a fjord in Svalbard (Spitsbergen), Norway, now known as Tjuvfjorden.

Early life
Deicrowe was born around 1560. He was apprenticed to Anthony Marlour.

Career

Deicrowe was freed from his apprenticeship by 1588.

He gave his name in 1616 to Deicrowe's Sound, a fjord in Svalbard, Norway, now known as Tjuvfjorden.

He was warden of the Muscovy Company in 1617 and 1627 and was a freeman of the Merchant Adventurers, the Russia and the East India Companies.

He owned property in London, Middlesex and Surrey.

Family
He married and had sons Benjamin, Robert and Valentine.

Death
He made his will in 1626 and amended it in 1632. He probably died in 1646 as probate was granted in December 1646.

References 

1560s births
1646 deaths
English merchants
Year of birth uncertain
People of the Muscovy Company
Year of death uncertain